The 2010–11 Minnesota Golden Gophers men's basketball team represented the University of Minnesota in the college basketball season of 2010–2011. The team's head coach, Tubby Smith was in his fourth year at Minnesota. The Golden Gophers played their home games at Williams Arena in Minneapolis, Minnesota and were members of the Big Ten Conference.

Season
The Gophers began their season without Devoe Joseph, who was suspended for 6 regular season games due to a violation of team rules.  Despite this, the Gophers won the early season Puerto Rico Tip-Off tournament by defeating Western Kentucky, then 8th-ranked North Carolina, and West Virginia.

Joseph then abruptly left the team in January, transferring to the University of Oregon.

Roster

2010–11 Schedule and results

|-
! colspan="9" style= |Exhibition

|-
! colspan="9" style=|Non-conference egular season 

|-
! colspan="9" style=|Big Ten regular season

|-
! colspan="9" style=|Big Ten tournament'''

Rankings

References

Minnesota Golden Gophers men's basketball seasons
Minnesota
2010 in sports in Minnesota
2011 in sports in Minnesota